Treinta y Tres is the capital city of the Treinta y Tres Department in eastern Uruguay.

History
Its name means "Thirty Three" and refers to the 19th-century national heroes, the 33 Orientales, who established the independence of Uruguay. Coincidentally, the city is located near the 33°S line of latitude, making the name doubly appropriate.

On 10 March 1853 it was declared a "Pueblo" (village) by the Act of Ley Nº 307 and on 20 September 1884 it was made capital of the department created by Ley Nº 1.754. According to the Act of Ley Nº 3.544, on 19 July 1909 it held the status of "Villa" (town), which was elevated to "Ciudad" (city) on 29 September 1915 by the Act of Ley 5.335.

Population
In 2011, Treinta y Tres had a population of 25,477. It is by far the largest town in what is a sparsely populated department. Together with Ejido de Treinta y Tres and the southwestern suburb of Villa Sara, they form a population centre of around 33,000 inhabitants.

Geography

The city is located on Route 8, on the north banks of Olimar Grande River. The city is almost surrounded by a populated rural area, a zone of chacras (ranches), known as Ejido de Treinta y Tres.

Climate
The climate in this area is characterized by hot, humid summers and generally mild to cool winters.  According to the Köppen Climate Classification system, Treinta y Tres has a humid subtropical climate, abbreviated "Cfa" on climate maps.

Places of worship
 St. Joseph the Worker Parish Church (Roman Catholic)
 Parish Church of Our Lady of the Thirty-Three (Roman Catholic)
 Parish Church of the Holy Savior (Roman Catholic)

Notable people 
Emiliano Alfaro - footballer
Gonzalo Lemes - footballer  
Darío Silva - footballer
Octavio Rivero - footballer

References

External links
Official Website
INE map of Treinta y Tres, Ejido de Treinta y Tres & Villa Sara

Populated places in the Treinta y Tres Department
Populated places established in 1853